Yésica Yolanda Bopp (born 11 April 1984) is an Argentine professional boxer. She is a two-division world champion, having held the WBA (Super) female light-flyweight title since November 2020 (WBA (Regular) title from 2008–2019), and previously the WBO female light-flyweight title from 2009 to 2013 and the WBO flyweight title in 2014. As of September 2020, she is ranked as the world's best active female light-flyweight by The Ring and BoxRec, and the seventh best active female, pound-for-pound, by The Ring and BoxRec, and ninth by ESPN.

Professional career
Bopp won the interim WBA female light flyweight title on 4 December 2008 after defeating Ana Fernandez, and made thirteen successful defenses. Bopp also won the WBO female light flyweight title on 6 November 2009. She successfully defended it against Carina Moreno on 29 January 2011, and followed that up with five more victories in 2011. During her time as champion, Bopp was ranked the best female light flyweight fighter in the world, according to BoxRec.

Professional boxing record

References

External links

1984 births
Living people
Sportspeople from Avellaneda
Argentine people of German descent
Argentine women boxers
AIBA Women's World Boxing Championships medalists
Flyweight boxers